The Land Forces of the National People's Army ( – LaSK), was the ground-based military branch of the German Democratic Republic (GDR) National People's Army (NPA). The Land Forces Command, located at Geltow, was established on 1 December 1972 as a management body created for the land forces.

Organisation 

Its largest formations between 1956 and 1990 were the Military Districts III and V, which generally consisted of three active divisions each, plus training, combat support and logistic units. The 1st Motor Rifle Division was additionally attached to the Military District V, but was designated to leave that formation in wartime to play a key role in the assault on West Berlin. The 6th Motor Rifle Division existed only for two years (1956–1958) as an active formation.

In wartime both military districts would form field armies: the 3rd Army in the south, reinforced by the GDR 6th, 10th, and 17th reserve divisions, and the 5th Army in the north, reinforced by the Soviet 94th Guards Motor Rifle Division and the 138th and 221st Separate Tank Regiments from the GSFG.

Order of battle (1980s)

Military District V (North) 

The headquarters of the northern district was in Neubrandenburg.

1st Motor Rifle Division (Potsdam)
1st Motor Rifle Regiment "Hans Beimler"
2nd Motor Rifle Regiment "Arthur Ladwig"
3rd Motor Rifle Regiment "Paul Hegenbarth"
1st Panzer Regiment "Friedrich Wolf"
1st Artillery Regiment "Rudolf Gypner"
1st AA-Missile Regiment "Anton Fischer"
1st Rocket Detachment "Rudi Arndt"
1st Heavy Mortar Detachment "Hermann Rentzsch"
1st Reconnaissance Battalion "Dr. Richard Sorge"
1st Engineer Battalion "Willi Becker"
1st Light AT Detachment "Willy Sägebrecht"
1st Signal Battalion "Bodo Uhse"
1st Logistical Security Battalion "Georg Handke"
1st Repair Battalion "Otto Schliwinski"
1st Chemical Defence Battalion "Herbert Kittelmann"
1st Medical Battalion
1st Replacement Regiment

8th Motor Rifle Division (Schwerin)
27th Motor Rifle Regiment "Hans Kahle"
28th Motor Rifle Regiment "Wilhelm Florin"
29th Motor Rifle Regiment "Ernst Moritz Arndt"
8th Panzer Regiment "Arthur Becker"
8th Artillery Regiment "Erich Mühsam"
8th AA-Missile Regiment "Willi Schröder"
8th Rocket Detachment "Hermann Schuldt"
8th Heavy Mortar Detachment "Mathias Thesen"
8th Reconnaissance Battalion "Otto Moritz"
8th Engineer Battalion "Tudor Vladimirescu"
8th Light AT Detachment "Heinrich Dollwetzel"
8th Signal Battalion "Kurt Bürger"
8th Logistical Security Battalion "Herbert Tschäpe"
8th Repair Battalion "Wilhelm Pieck"
8th Chemical Defence Battalion "Erich Correns"
8th Medical Battalion "Hans Rodenberg"
8th Replacement Regiment

9th Panzer Division (Eggesin)
21st Panzer Regiment "Walter Empacher"
22nd Panzer Regiment "Soja Kosmodemjanskaja"
23rd Panzer Regiment "Julian Marchlewski"
9th Motor Rifle Regiment "Rudolf Renner"
9th Artillery Regiment "Hans Fischer"
9th AA-Missile Regiment "Rudolf Dölling"
9th Rocket Detachment "Otto Nuschk"
9th Heavy Mortar Detachment "Friedrich Ebert"
9th Reconnaissance Battalion "Eduard Claudius"
9th Engineer Battalion
9th Signal Battalion "Adolf Bytzeck"
9th Logistical Security Battalion "Robert Stamm"
9th Repair Battalion "Paul Dessau"
9th Chemical Defence Battalion "Michael Niederkirchner"
9th Medical Battalion "Wolfgang Langhoff"
9th Replacement Regiment

Military District III (South) 

The headquarters of the southern district was in Leipzig.

4th Motor Rifle Division (Erfurt)
22nd Motor Rifle Regiment "Thomas Müntzer"
23rd Motor Rifle Regiment "Anton Saefkow"
24th Motor Rifle Regiment "John Scheer"
4th Panzer Regiment "August Bebel"
4th Artillery Regiment "Willi Bredel"
4th AA-Missile Regiment "Hermann Danz"
4th Rocket Detachment "Hugo Gräf"
4th Heavy Mortar Detachment "Otto Franke"
4th Reconnaissance Battalion "Wilhelm Girnius"
4th Engineer Battalion "Walter Kaiser-Gorrish"
4th Light AT Detachment "Franz Jacob"
4th Signal Battalion "Wilhelm Liebknecht"
4th Logistical Security Battalion "Ernst Putz"
4th Repair Battalion "Wilhelm Leuschner"
4th Chemical Defence Battalion "Lothar Bolz"
4th Medical Battalion
4th Replacement Regiment

7th Panzer Division (Dresden)
14th Panzer Regiment "Karol Swierczewski"
15th Panzer Regiment "Paul Hornick"
16th Panzer Regiment "Leo Jogiches"
7th Motor Rifle Regiment "Max Roscher"
7th Artillery Regiment "Albert Hößler"
7th AA-Missile Regiment "Paul Rockstroh"
7th Rocket Detachment "Alfred Kurella"
7th Heavy Mortar Detachment "Ernst Schneller"
7th Reconnaissance Battalion "Ludvik Svoboda"
7th Engineer Battalion "Arthur Thiermann"
7th Signal Battalion "Egon Dreger"
7th Logistical Security Battalion "Kurt Schlosser"
7th Repair Battalion "Gustav Schneider"
7th Chemical Defence Battalion "Johann Eggert"
7th Medical Battalion
7th Replacement Regiment

11th Motor Rifle Division (Halle)
16th Motor Rifle Regiment "Robert Uhrig"
17th Motor Rifle Regiment "Fritz Weineck"
18th Motor Rifle Regiment "Otto Schlag"
11th Panzer Regiment "Otto Buchwitz"
11th Artillery Regiment "Wilhelm Koenen"
11th AA-Missile Regiment "Georg Stöber"
11th Rocket Detachment "Magnus Poser"
11th Heavy Mortar Detachment "Otto Gotsche"
11th Reconnaissance Battalion "Heinrich Brandes"
11th Engineer Battalion "Willi Gall"
11th Light AT Detachment "Hermann Vogt"
11th Signal Battalion "Otto Brosowski"
11th Logistical Security Battalion "Bernhard Koenen"
11th Repair Battalion "Albert Funk"
11th Chemical Defence Battalion "Erwin Hörnle"
11th Medical Battalion "Louis Kugelmann"
11th Replacement Regiment

Second line divisions 

In the event of a full-scale mobilisation, the six regular divisions of the NVA would have been supplemented by three mobilisation divisions and two reserve divisions. All five divisions would be mobilised on M+2. The cadre of each mobilisation/reserve division remained on hand as the regular staff of training centers/non-commissioned officer (NCO) schools. The five second line divisions were the 6th Motor Rifle Division (Königswartha), the 10th Motor Rifle Division (Ronneburg), the 17th Motor Rifle Division (Petersroda), the 19th Motor Rifle Division (Wulkow, which was not based on a training centre), and the 20th Motor Rifle Division (Bredenfelde).

Mobilisation Divisions – command of the Military District III of land forces (Leipzig)

6th Motor Rifle Division (Königswartha)

11th Motor Rifle Regiment
12th Motor Rifle Regiment
13th Motor Rifle Regiment
6th Panzer Regiment
6th Artillery Regiment
6th AA-Missile Regiment
6th Rocket Detachment
6th Heavy Mortar Detachment
6th Reconnaissance Battalion
6th Engineer Battalion
6th Light AT Detachment
6th Signal Battalion
6th Logistical Security Battalion
6th Repair Battalion
6th Chemical Defence Battalion
6th Medical Battalion
6th Replacement Regiment

10th Motor Rifle Division (Ronneburg)

14th Motor Rifle Regiment
15th Motor Rifle Regiment
16th Motor Rifle Regiment
10th Panzer Regiment
10th Artillery Regiment
10th AA-Missile Regiment
10th Rocket Detachment
10th Heavy Mortar Detachment
10th Reconnaissance Battalion
10th Engineer Battalion
10th Light AT Detachment
10th Signal Battalion
10th Logistical Security Battalion
10th Repair Battalion
10th Chemical Defence Battalion
10th Medical Battalion
10th Replacement Regiment

17th Motor Rifle Division (Petersroda)
41st Motor Rifle Regiment
42nd Motor Rifle Regiment
43rd Motor Rifle Regiment
17th Panzer Regiment
17th Artillery Regiment
17th AA-Missile Regiment
17th Rocket Detachment
17th Heavy Mortar Detachment
17th Reconnaissance Battalion
17th Engineer Battalion
17th Light AT Detachment
17th Signal Battalion
17th Logistical Security Battalion
17th Repair Battalion
17th Chemical Defence Battalion
17th Medical Battalion
17th Replacement Regiment

Reserve divisions – command of the Military District V of land forces (Neubrandenburg)

19th Motor Rifle Division (Wulkow)
51st Motor Rifle Regiment
52nd Motor Rifle Regiment
53rd Motor Rifle Regiment
19th Panzer Regiment
19th Artillery Regiment
19th AA-Missile Regiment
19th Rocket Detachment
19th Heavy Mortar Detachment
19th Reconnaissance Battalion
19th Engineer Battalion
19th Light AT Detachment
19th Signal Battalion
19th Logistical Security Battalion
19th Repair Battalion
19th Chemical Defence Battalion
19th Medical Battalion
19th Replacement Regiment

20th Motor Rifle Division (Bredenfelde)
33rd Motor Rifle Regiment
34th Motor Rifle Regiment
35th Motor Rifle Regiment
20th Panzer Regiment
20th Artillery Regiment
20th AA-Missile Regiment
20th Rocket Detachment
20th Heavy Mortar Detachment
20th Reconnaissance Battalion
20th Engineer Battalion
20th Light AT Detachment
20th Signal Battalion
20th Logistical Security Battalion
20th Repair Battalion
20th Chemical Defence Battalion
20th Medical Battalion
20th Replacement Regiment

Aviation units 
 Kampfhubschraubergeschwader 3 (KHG-3) "Ferdinand von Schill", Cottbus
 I. Hubschrauberstaffel/KHG-3 (I.HS/KHG-3), Mi-8TB
 II. Hubschrauberstaffel/KHG-3 (II.HS/KHG-3), Mi-24D
 KHG-3 maintained several detachments:
 FTK-512 at Neuhaus-Steinheid
 FTK-514 at Kreuzebra
 GR-9 at Meiningen
Hubschrauberstaffel der Führung und Aufklarung 3 (HSFA-3), Mi-2, Mi-8PS, Mi-9
 Kampfhubschraubergeschwader 5 (KHG-5) "Adolf von Lützow", Basepohl
 I. Hubschrauberstaffel/KHG-5 (I.HS/KHG-5), Mi-8TB
 II. Hubschrauberstaffel/KHG-5 (II.HS/KHG-5), Mi-24D
 III. Hubschrauberstaffel/KHG-5 (III.HS/KHG-5), Mi-24P
 KHG-5 maintained several detachments:
 FTK-432 at Gross Molzahn
 FTK-613 at Athenstedt
 FTK-614 at Altensalzwedel
 Hubschrauberstaffel der Führung und Aufklarung 5 (HSFA-5), Mi-2, Mi-8PS. Mi-9

Other units 
The  also contained some specially trained units – like the 40th Paratrooper Battalion (later the 40th Air Assault Regiment "Willi Sänger"). The structure and equipment was mostly of Soviet design, and the NVA operated in close collaboration with the Group of Soviet Forces in Germany. There were also reports of a special NVA diversionary battalion in south Germany equipped with M-48s and M-113s, to cause confusion amongst NATO forces (emulating and improving on the example of Otto Skorzeny's 150th Panzer Brigade during the Ardennes Offensive). However more recent reports throw doubt on the existence of any such unit.

Types of units 
Divisions
 (motorised/mechanised infantry division)
 (tank/armoured division)
Regiments
 (artillery regiment)
 (tank/armoured regiment)
 (replacement regiment)
 (AA-missile regiment)
 (motor rifle/mechanised infantry regiment)
Battalions
 (reconnaissance battalion)
 (chemical defence battalion)
 (logistical security battalion)
 (repair battalion)
 (signal battalion)
 (engineer battalion)
 (medical battalion)
Detachments
 (light AT detachment)
 (rocket detachment)
 (heavy mortar detachment)

Equipment 
Small Arms:

Armoured Vehicles:

Field artillery and rocket artillery

Rocket systems 
 9K52 Luna-M
 R-17 Elbrus
 OTR-21 Tochka
 OTR-23 Oka
 BM-21 Grad
 RM-70

Towed artillery 
 100 mm anti-tank gun T-12
 122 mm howitzer 2A18 (D-30)
 152 mm towed gun-howitzer M1955 (D-20)
 130 mm towed field gun M1954 (M-46)
 85 mm divisional gun D-44

Self-propelled artillery 
 2S1 Gvozdika
 2S3 Akatsiya

Mortars 
 82-BM-37
 2S12 Sani
 120-PM-43 mortar

Air defense artillery systems

Mobile missile 
 2K11 Krug
 2K12 Kub
 9K31 Strela-1 on BRDM-2 chassis
 9K35 Strela-10 on MT-LB chassis
 9K33 Osa

Mobile self-propelled AA guns 
 ZSU-23-4 Shilka
 ZSU-57-2

Towed anti-aircraft gun 
 ZPU
 ZU-23-2
 S-60

References

Further reading 
 Dale Roy Herspring, Requiem for an army: the demise of the East German military, Rowman & Littlefield Publishers, 1998, 9780847687183, 249 pages
 Jörg Schönbohm, Two armies and one fatherland: the end of the Nationale Volksarmee, Berghahn Books, 1996, 
 Zilian, Jr., Frederick. 'From Confrontation to Cooperation: The Takeover of the National People's (East German) Army by the Bundeswehr,' Praeger, Westport, Conn., 1999, . Reviewed by Dale R. Herspring in The Journal of Military History, July 2000, p. 912–914

External links 
 NVA Forum

National People's Army
National People's Army (East Germany)
Disbanded armies
Military units and formations established in 1956
Military units and formations disestablished in 1990